Grimes is a Canadian singer, songwriter, record producer and visual artist. She has received various awards and nominations for her work in each of the aforementioned fields. Grimes rose to prominence in the early 2010s, receiving multiple honors for her work as a recording artist. Her third studio album, Visions (2012), won Electronic Album of the Year at the Juno Awards of 2013, and she received many nominations for her work as a director on the video for the album's promotional single "Oblivion", and further nominations for the videos for Visions single "Genesis" and non-album single "Go". She continued to receive honors with the release of her fourth studio album, Art Angels (2015), winning Video of the Year for "Kill V. Maim" and "Venus Fly", at the Juno Awards of 2017 and 2018, respectively.

A2IM Libera Awards
The A2IM Libera Awards are dedicated to celebrating independent musicians across all genres, created by Richard James Burgess. Grimes has received one award.

!
|-
| rowspan="1"| 2016
| "Kill V. Maim"
| Video of the Year
| 
| rowspan="1" align="center"|
|}

AIM Independent Music Awards
The AIM Independent Music Awards are a UK-based ceremony celebrating the best in independent music

!
|-
| rowspan="1"| 2016
| "Kill V. Maim"
| Independent Video of the Year
| 
| rowspan="1" align="center"|
|}

Antville Music Video Awards
The Antville Music Video Awards are annual online awards that recognize the best music videos of the past year. Grimes has received three nominations.

!
|-
| rowspan="3"| 2012
| rowspan="3"| "Oblivion"
| Video of the Year
| 
| rowspan="3" align="center"|
|-
| Best choreography
| 
|-
| Best performance 
| 
|-
|}

Berlin Music Video Awards
The Berlin Music Video Awards (BMVA) is a festival and networking event for filmmakers, directors, artists, musicians, and music video fans held annually in Berlin, Germany. The four-day event consists of music video marathons, live performances, DJ sets, various workshops, and fashion. The BMVA highlights that anyone can participate - quality, originality and diversity will be rewarded.

!
|-
| 2022
| "Player of Games"
| Best Cinematography
| 
|

Best Art Vinyl
The Best Art Vinyl award has been awarded since 2005 by Art Vinyl Ltd for the best album artwork of the past year. The award is judged by public vote from a list of 50 nominations from music industry and graphic design experts.

!
|-
| 2020
| Miss Anthropocene
| Best Vinyl Art
| 
|

Harper's Bazaar Women of the Year Awards
The Harper's Bazaar Women of the Year Awards are held to celebrate women in fashion. Grimes has received one award.

!
|-
| rowspan="1"| 2016
| Grimes
| Musician of the Year 2016
| 
| rowspan="1" align="center"|
|}

Canadian Independent Music Awards
The Canadian Independent Music Awards are held to celebrate Canadian and International independent musicians, held during Canadian Music Week. Grimes has received one nomination.

!
|-
| rowspan="1"| 2017
| "Flesh Without Blood"
| Single of the Year
| 
| rowspan="1" align="center"|
|}

GAFFA Awards
The GAFFA Awards (Danish: GAFFA Prisen) have been awarded since 1991 by Danish magazine of the same name in the field of popular music.

!
|-
| rowspan=2|2021
| Herself
| Best International Solo Act
| 
|rowspan="2" align="center"|
|-
| Miss Anthropocene
| Best International Album
|

Hungarian Music Awards
The Hungarian Music Awards is the national music awards of Hungary, held every year since 1992 and promoted by Mahasz.

|-
| 2021
| Miss Anthropocene
| Best Foreign Electronic Album
|

iHeartRadio Much Music Video Awards
The iHeartRadio Much Music Video Awards are annual awards presented by the Canadian television channel Much to honour the year's best music videos. Grimes has received won award from nine nominations.

!
|-
| rowspan="1"| 2013
| rowspan="1"| "Genesis"
| Dance Video of the Year
| 
| rowspan="1" align="center"|
|-
| rowspan="3"| 2015
| rowspan="3"| "Go"
| Video of the Year
| 
| rowspan="3" align="center"|
|-
| Best Post-Production
| 
|-
| Best Director
| 
|-
| rowspan="2"| 2016
| rowspan="2"| "Flesh Without Blood"
| Video of the Year
| 
| rowspan="2" align="center"|
|-
| Best Director
| 
|-
| rowspan="3"| 2017
| rowspan="3"| "Venus Fly" (featuring Janelle Monáe)
| Best EDM/Dance Video
| 
| rowspan="3" align="center"|
|-
| Best Pop Video
| 
|-
| Fan Fave Video
| 
|-
|}

International Dance Music Awards
The International Dance Music Awards are held as a part of the Winter Music Conference in Miami Beach, Florida to recognize and honor exceptional achievements in 57 award categories. Grimes has received two nominations.

!
|-
| rowspan="2"| 2016
| "Flesh Without Blood"
| Best Alternative/Indie Rock Dance Track
| 
| rowspan="2" align="center"|
|-
| Grimes
| Best Breakthrough Artist (Solo)
| 
|}

Juno Awards
The Juno Awards are held annually to celebrate the best of Canadian musicians. Grimes has won four awards from five nominations.

!
|-
| rowspan="2"| 2013
| rowspan="1"| Visions
| Electronic Album of the Year
| 
| rowspan="2" align="center"|
|-
| rowspan="1"| Grimes
| rowspan="1"| Breakthrough Artist of the Year
| 
|-
| rowspan="3"| 2017
| rowspan="2"| Art Angels
| Alternative Album of the Year
| 
| rowspan="2" align="center"|
|-
| Recording Package of the Year
| 
|-
| rowspan="1"| "Kill V. Maim"
| rowspan="2"| Video of the Year
| 
| rowspan="2" align="center"|
|-
| rowspan="1"| 2018
| rowspan="1"| "Venus Fly"
| 
|-
| style="text-align:center;"|2023
| "Shinigami Eyes"
| Dance Recording of the Year
| 
| style="text-align:center;"| 
|-
|}

NME Awards
The NME Awards are an annual music awards show in the United Kingdom, founded by the music magazine NME. Grimes has been nominated for five awards.

!
|-
| rowspan="2"| 2013
| rowspan="1"| Grimes
| Best Solo Artist
| 
| rowspan="2" align="center"|
|-
| rowspan="1"| "Oblivion"
| Best Music Video
| 
|-
| rowspan="1"| 2014
| rowspan="1"| actuallygrimes.tumblr.com
| Best Band Blog or Twitter
| 
| rowspan="1" align="center"|
|-
| rowspan="2"| 2016
| rowspan="1"| Grimes
| Best International Solo Artist
| 
| rowspan="2" align="center"|
|-
| rowspan="1"| Art Angels
| Best Album
| 
|}

Polaris Music Prize
The Polaris Music Prize is a music award annually given to the best full-length Canadian album based on artistic merit, regardless of genre, sales, or record label. Grimes has been nominated twice.

!
|-
| rowspan="1"| 2012
| rowspan="1"| Visions
| Best Canada Album of 2012
| 
| rowspan="1" align="center"|
|-
| rowspan="1"| 2016
| rowspan="1"| Art Angels
| Best Canada Album of 2016
| 
| rowspan="1" align="center"|
|-
|}

Rober Awards Music Prize

!Ref.
|-
| 2020
| Herself
| Best Pop Artist
| 
|

UK Music Video Awards
The UK Music Video Awards is an annual celebration of the best in music video. Grimes has received two nominations.

!
|-
| rowspan="1"| 2012
| rowspan="1"| "Oblivion"
| Best Alternative Video - International
| 
| rowspan="1" align="center"|
|-
| 2020
| "Cry" (with Ashnikko)
| Best Pop Video - UK
| 
|rowspan="1" align="center"|
|}

Webby Awards
The Webby Awards is an award for excellence on the Internet presented annually by The International Academy of Digital Arts and Sciences. Grimes has received one award from two nominations.

!
|-
| rowspan="1"| 2013
| rowspan="1"| Grimes
| Artist of the Year
| 
| rowspan="1" align="center"|
|-
| rowspan="1"|2017
| rowspan="1"| Art Angel (Documentary)
| Online Film & Video - Music
| 
| rowspan="1" align="center"|
|-
|}

References

Awards and nominations
Grimes